Aimé Raleigh (Pete) Adam (December 5, 1913 – January 7, 2009) was a politician in Manitoba, Canada.  He served as a New Democratic member of the Legislative Assembly of Manitoba from 1971 to 1986, and was a cabinet minister in the government of Howard Pawley.

Adam was born in Radville, Saskatchewan, the son of Lionel and Marcella Adam. His nickname "Pete" came from his mother's French name for him: "petit" (small). While he was still young, his family moved to Toutes Aides, Manitoba and later to Crane River. In 1937, he married Mary Didychuk. After they married, the couple moved to Winnipeg, where Adam worked for the Canadian National Railway. He later returned to Crane River to help his father. In 1949, Adam opened an International Harvester farm implement dealership with his brother at Ste. Rose du Lac. In 1961, he began farming and ranching near Ochre River. He was a charter member of the National Farmers Union and served as president of its Local 509.

He was first elected to the Manitoba legislature in a 1971 by-election in the rural riding of Ste. Rose, called after the sitting MLA, former Liberal leader Gildas Molgat, was appointed to the Senate of Canada.  Although the NDP had never won the seat before, Adam scored a convincing victory over his Liberal and Progressive Conservative opponents, and provided Edward Schreyer's government with a functioning majority.  He was easily re-elected in the election of 1973, although he was not appointed to Schreyer's cabinet.

Adam was again re-elected in the 1977 election, which was won by the Tories under Sterling Lyon.  In early 1979, he supported Howard Pawley's bid to replace Schreyer as interim leader of the party.

The NDP under Pawley returned to government in the election of 1981, although Adam ironically faced the toughest re-election challenge of his career, defeating Progressive Conservative candidate Ivan Traill by fewer than 200 votes.  It may be noted that there was no Liberal candidate in this race and that most traditionally Liberal voters in rural Manitoba had shifted to the Progressive Conservatives by this time.

Despite being almost seventy years old, Adam was appointed Minister of Municipal Affairs and Minister of Cooperative Development on November 30, 1981.  He was relieved of the latter position on August 20, 1982, and of the former on November 4, 1983, when he was named Minister of Government Services in a cabinet shuffle.  Adam left cabinet entirely on January 30, 1985, and did not seek re-election in 1986.

Adam was a prominent defender of Canada's Western Grain Transportation Act (sometimes called the "Crow Benefit"), a subsidy which covered transportation costs for farmers shipping wheat.  On one occasion, he printed off a series of buttons with the slogan, "Save the Crow".

After he retired, Adam moved to Dauphin, Manitoba. He died there at the age of 95.

References

1913 births
2009 deaths
New Democratic Party of Manitoba MLAs
Franco-Manitoban people
Members of the Executive Council of Manitoba
People from Radville, Saskatchewan
Fransaskois people